Iliff  may refer to:
Iliff, Colorado
Iliff (RTD), a station on the RTD rail system in Aurora, Colorado, United States
Iliff School of Theology

People
John Wesley Iliff
Iliff David Richardson